The British Classics are five long-standing Group 1 horse races run during the traditional flat racing season. They are restricted to three-year-old horses and traditionally represent the pinnacle of achievement for racehorses against their own age group. As such, victory in any classic marks a horse as amongst the very best of a generation. Victory in two or even three of the series (a rare feat known as the Triple Crown) marks a horse as truly exceptional.

Races

The five British Classics are:

It is common to think of them as taking place in three legs.

The first leg is made up of the Newmarket Classics – 1000 Guineas and 2000 Guineas. Given that the 1,000 Guineas is restricted to fillies, this is regarded as the fillies' classic and the 2,000, which is open to both sexes, as the colts' classic, although it is theoretically possible for a filly to compete in both.

The second leg is made up of The Derby and/or Oaks, both ridden over  miles at Epsom in early June. The Oaks is regarded as the fillies' classic, the Derby as the colts', although, as with the Guineas, a filly could theoretically contest both.

The final leg is the St Leger, held over 1 mile  furlongs at Doncaster and is open to both sexes.

The variety of distances and racecourses faced in the Classics make them particularly challenging as a series to even the best horses. It is rare for a horse to possess both the speed and stamina to compete across all these distances, making the Triple Crown a particularly notable achievement. In fact, in the modern era, it is rare for any attempt on the Triple Crown to be made.

Geldings are excluded from the 2000 Guineas, Derby and St Leger, in common with all European Group One races restricted to three-year-olds.

History

Although the oldest race in the series, the St Leger, was first run 1776, the races were not designated "classics" until 1815, shortly after the first running of the 1,000 Guineas.

Multiple classic winners
(see also Triple Crown of Thoroughbred Racing)

In 1902 Sceptre became the only racehorse to win four British Classic Races outright, winning both Guineas, the Oaks and the St Leger. Previously, in 1868, Formosa won the same four races but dead-heated in the 2,000 Guineas.

Fifteen horses have won the standard Triple Crown (2,000 Guineas – Derby – St Leger), the last being Nijinsky in 1970. Three of these achieved the feat during the World War I when all five Classic races were run at Newmarket.

In addition to Sceptre and Formosa above, eight horses have won the fillies' Triple Crown (1,000 Guineas – Oaks – St Leger), the last being Oh So Sharp in 1985.

Many horses have won two classics, some of whom have gone on to attempt the Triple Crown, losing in the last leg at Doncaster. The most recent example of this was the Aidan O'Brien trained Camelot, who finished second in the St Leger in 2012 after winning the 2,000 Guineas and Derby.

Four classic wins
 Formosa 1868
 Sceptre 1902

Three classic wins

 Crucifix 1840
 West Australian 1853
 Gladiateur 1865
 Lord Lyon 1866
 Hannah 1871
 Apology 1874
 Ormonde 1886
 Common 1891
 La Fleche 1892
 Isinglass 1893
 Galtee More 1897
 Flying Fox 1899
 Diamond Jubilee 1900
 Rock Sand 1903
 Pretty Polly 1904
 Pommern 1915
 Gay Crusader 1917
 Gainsborough 1918
 Bahram 1935
 Sun Chariot 1942
 Meld 1955
 Nijinsky 1970
 Oh So Sharp 1985

Two classic wins

 Champion (1800)
 Eleanor (1801)
 Smolensko (1813)
 Neva (1817)
 Corinne (1818)
 Pastille (1822)
 Zinc (1823)
 Cobweb (1824)
 Cadland (1828)
 Galata (1832)
 Queen of Trumps (1835)
 Bay Middleton (1836)
 Cotherstone (1843)
 Mendicant (1846)
 Sir Tatton Sykes (1846)
 Surplice (1848)
 The Flying Dutchman (1849)
 Voltigeur (1850)
 Stockwell (1852)
 Blink Bonny (1857)
 Imperieuse (1857)
 Governess (1858)
 The Marquis (1862)
 Macaroni (1863)
 Blair Athol (1864)
 Achievement (1867)
 Pretender (1869)
 Reine (1872)
 Marie Stuart (1873)
 Spinaway (1875)
 Camelia (1876)
 Petrarch (1876)
 Silvio (1877)
 Jannette (1878)
 Pilgrimage (1878)
 Wheel of Fortune (1879)
 Iroquois (1881)
 Thebais (1881)
 Shotover (1882)
 Busybody (1884)
 Melton (1885)
 Miss Jummy (1886)
 Reve d'Or (1887)
 Ayrshire (1888)
 Seabreeze (1888)
 Donovan (1889)
 Memoir (1890)
 Mimi (1891)
 Amiable (1894)
 Ladas (1894)
 Sir Visto (1895)
 Persimmon (1896)
 St Amant (1904)
 Cherry Lass (1905)
 Signorinetta (1908)
 Minoru (1909)
 Sunstar (1911)
 Tagalie (1912)
 Jest (1913)
 Princess Dorrie (1914)
 Fifinella (1916)
 Tranquil (1923)
 Manna (1925)
 Saucy Sue (1925)
 Coronach (1926)
 Trigo (1929)
 Cameronian (1931)
 Hyperion (1933)
 Windsor Lad (1934)
 Exhibitionnist (1937)
 Rockfel (1938)
 Blue Peter (1939)
 Galatea (1939)
 Godiva (1940)
 Herringbone (1943)
 Sun Stream (1945)
 Airborne (1946)
 Imprudence (1947)
 Musidora (1949)
 Nimbus (1949)
 Tulyar (1952)
 Never Say Die (1954)
 Crepello (1957)
 Bella Paola (1958)
 Petite Etoile (1959)
 Never Too Late (1960)
 St Paddy (1960)
 Sweet Solera (1961)
 Royal Palace (1967)
 Sir Ivor (1968)
 Altesse Royale (1971)
 Mysterious (1973)
 Dunfermline (1977)
 Sun Princess (1983)
 Midway Lady (1986)
 Reference Point (1987)
 Nashwan (1989)
 Salsabil (1990)
 User Friendly (1992)
 Kazzia (2002)
 Sea The Stars (2009)
 Camelot (2012)
 Minding (2016)
 Love (2020)

Records
Most wins as a horse
Sceptre – 4 wins (1902)

Most wins as a jockey
Lester Piggott – 30 wins (1954–1992)

Most wins as a trainer
John Scott – 40 wins (1827-1863)
 Aidan O'Brien – 41 wins (1998–present)

See also
 :Category:British Classic Race winners
 English Triple Crown race winners
 French Classic Races
 Japanese Classic Races
 Irish Classic Races
 United States Triple Crown of Thoroughbred Racing
 Canadian Triple Crown of Thoroughbred Racing

References

 British Classic Races
History of horse racing